The Baltic Coal Terminal is a special purpose company operating a specialized coal terminal in the Free port of Ventspils, Latvia.

Terminal
The terminal project started in 2005. The construction permit was issued by the Ventspils City Council in July 2005. The coal terminal was officially opened on 24 November 2008.  The main purpose of the terminal is to store and ship Russian coal to Western Europe and the USA.

The Baltic Coal Terminal is the first closed-end coal terminal in the Baltic region. The terminal was designed by the Latvian company Ierosme, and the construction was carried out by Ventspils Tirdzniecības Osta-G. A new pier with two quays for coal handling was designed by the architect offices Veralux Ehitus and it was constructed by Latvijas Tilti. The terminal equipment was provided by Fam  Мagdeburger Förderanlagen und Baumaschinen. The total amount of the investments made reaches €75 millions which includes bank financing as well as shareholders' investments. The bank syndicate included DnB NORD, Nordea, and UniCredit.

The annual capacity of the terminal is five million tons of coal. After the second building phase finished the terminal will be capable of letting through up to ten million tons of coal per year.

Company
JSC Baltic Coal Terminal was incorporated in January 2005. The shareholders of JSC Baltic Coal Terminal are Latvian stevedore company Ventspils Tirdzniecības Osta (Ventspils Commercial Port) and the LLC Indteс Baltic Coal, a subsidiary of Indtec Finanse B.V. of Coal Company Zarechnaya, which owns Russian coal mine Zarechnaya of Kuznetsk Basin. The Chairman of the Board is Alexander Starikov and the Vice-Chairman of the Board is Valery Pashuta.

References

External links
 Company website

Coal terminals
Transport infrastructure in Latvia
Energy infrastructure in Latvia
Companies of Latvia
Coal companies
Ventspils
2008 establishments in Latvia
Latvian companies established in 2008
Transport companies established in 2008